Chandleria is a genus of rove beetles in the subfamily Pselaphinae.

References

External links 

 
 Chandleria at insectoid.info

Pselaphinae genera